This is a list of films which have reached number one at the weekend box office in Taipei, Taiwan during 2017.

Films

See also 
 2017 Taiwanese films
 List of highest-grossing films in Taiwan

Footnotes

External links 

2017
Taipei
2017 in Taiwan